The Sree Subrahmanya Swamy temple (Perumthrikkovil) in Haripad is one of the largest and oldest temples in Kerala. It is dedicated to Subrahmanya Swamy, and is also known as Kerala Palani or Dakshina Palani (Southern Palani). It is believed that the temple was established even before the advent of Kali Yuga. It is the largest Subrahmanya Swami Temple in Kerala with longest golden  flagpost or dhwajastambha (kodimaram in Malayalam). It is widely believed that Lord Shiva and Lord Vishnu also reside in the idol, and thus the deity is considered extremely powerful.

Early history

It is believed that the idol has been used by Parasurama for Poojas and was left in Kandanalloor in Govindamuttom Backwaters from which it was recovered. It is said that all the landlords of Eakachakra (the then Haripad) had vision regarding the idol in the same time which led them to find the idol in Kayamkulam lake. The idol was brought ashore at Nelpurakadavu. In commemoration of retrieval of the idol Vigraha Labdhi Jalolsavam is conducted in Payippad river for three days, after Thiruvonam. Legend has it that the idol was kept for public viewing for Ara Nazhika (half an hour) under a banyan tree that belonged to a Christian family, Tharakanmar. There still exists a small temple where the idol was kept known as "Ara Nazhika Ambalam".

The temple was consecrated on the Pushya star of Makara Masa. This day is celebrated as the founding day of the temple every year. It is believed that Lord Vishnu appeared as a saint to consecrate the temple. (Hence the name Harigeethapuram for the present Haripad). In Malayalam year 1096 the temple caught fire but the golden flag mast and the Koothambalam was savede. The temple was rebuilt during the reign of King Sree Chithira Thirunal Rama Varma and the golden flag mast was re-installed.

Primary deity
The presiding deity of the temple is Karthikeya four armed form with Vel in one hand, Vajrayudha in another hand one hand bestowing blessing and the other toughing its thighs. The idol is about six feet in height. The idol is believed to have presence of Vishnu, Shiva and Brahma. The idol faces East.

Other deities
Beside the main deity there are many other deities which include Lord Dakshinamooorthy, Lord Ganesh, Thiruvambadi Kannan, Nāga, Shasta, Keezhthrikkovil Subrahmanyan.

Temple description

The temple has four gopurams. It has a golden flag mast on eastern side. The temple's sanctum sanctorum is round in shape. The temple compound also hosts a Koothambalam (the third largest of its kind among Kerala temples). Peacocks, Murugan's vahana, are protected and housed in the temple premises. The temple pond, popularly known as Perumkulam is one of the largest temple ponds in Kerala, stretching over about five acres.

Festivals

The unique feature of this temple is that having 3 kodiyettu (hoisting dhvaja on dhvaja stambha) utsavas in a calendar year. Another specialty is that these festivals are observed on the basis of Tamil calendar. The Avani Utsavam in Chingom, Markazhi Utsavam in Dhanu, Chithira Utsavam in Medom form the Utsava Trayam. In these three utsavas, three bhavas are attributed to the deity such as Lord Vishnu in Avani, as Lord Shiva in Markazhi, as Lord Subrahmanya himself in Chithira. Therefore, Chithira Thiruvulsavam, the annual festival, is the most important here. Thrikkarthika in Vrischikam, Prathishta day in Idavam, Skanda Ashthami in Thulam, Navarathri in Kanni and Thaipooyam in Makaram are some of the other important festivals of the Haripad Temple.

See also

 Temples of Kerala
 Temple festivals of Kerala

References

Further reading

Hindu temples in Alappuzha district
Hindu pilgrimage sites in India
Murugan temples in Kerala